Bullis School is an independent, co-educational college preparatory day school for grades K-12. The school is located in Potomac, Maryland, a suburb of Washington, D.C.

History 
Bullis was founded in Washington D.C. in 1930 by Commander William Francis Bullis as a preparatory school for the United States Naval Academy and the United States Military Academy at West Point, New York. The school moved in 1934 to Silver Spring, Maryland, and began its four-year college preparatory program. Between 1964 and 1969, the school moved to its current location in Potomac, Maryland, and in 1981, became co-educational.

Athletics 
Competitive sports are introduced in Middle School. Upper and Middle School students participate in more than 60 interscholastic teams in a variety of sports with other area independent schools.

Upper School students participate in the IAC and ISL leagues. Fall sports include football, cheerleading, boys and girls soccer, girls' tennis, field hockey and cross-country. Winter sports include boys and girls basketball, wrestling, ice hockey and swimming. Spring sports include softball, baseball, boys and girls' lacrosse, boys' tennis, golf, and track and field.

Green energy 
As a K–12 school that uses renewable energy, Bullis ranks fourth in the US according to the EPA's Green Power Partnership. The school is powered by wind through the purchase of wind credits and the production of solar energy from 540 photovoltaic solar panels installed in December 2009 on the roof of the school's Blair Center.

Academics 
Bullis is accredited by the Middle States Association of Colleges and Schools.

Notable alumni 
 Steve Armas, professional soccer player
 Cam Brown, NFL linebacker
 Tom Brown, professional football player
 Monique Currie, basketball player
 John Diehl, professional football player
 Seth Davis, broadcaster
 Moise Fokou, professional football player
 Amy B. Harris, screenwriter and producer
 Dwayne Haskins, NFL quarterback
 Justin Herron, NFL offensive tackle
 Tanard Jackson, NFL safety
 Doug Moe, professional basketball player and coach
 Princess Noor Pahlavi, granddaughter of the last Emperor of Iran
 Princess Farah Pahlavi, second granddaughter of the last Emperor of Iran 
 John Phillips, musician
 Caroline Queen, Olympic kayaker
 Henry Rollins, musician
 Robert Sampson, professional basketball player
 Jake Scott All-American University of Georgia and NFL safety
 Rodney Wallace, professional soccer player

References

External links
 

Defunct United States military academies
Independent School League
Educational institutions established in 1930
Private K-12 schools in Montgomery County, Maryland
1930 establishments in Maryland
Schools in Potomac, Maryland